John Michael "Jack" Daugherty (born July 3, 1960) is a former major league first baseman and outfielder for parts of seven seasons with the Texas Rangers, Houston Astros, Cincinnati Reds and Montreal Expos.

Career

Amateur career
Daugherty played high school baseball at Kearny High School, in San Diego, California. At the collegiate level he played for the University of Arizona, and was signed as an undrafted free agent by the Oakland Athletics on October 9, .

Minors & Independent League
Daugherty was released by the A's in January  after only one season in their farm system. He played the 1984 season for the independent Helena Gold Sox of the Pioneer Baseball League before signing with the Montreal Expos in December.

Montreal Expos
He was 1 for 10 in 11 games with his only hit coming against Greg Maddux. After spending the entire  season in the minors, batting .285 for the Indianapolis Indians, he was sent to the Texas Rangers to complete an earlier deal in which the Rangers sent Tom O'Malley to the Expos for a player to be named later.

Texas Rangers
In  he was used as a pinch hitter, back-up first baseman, left fielder and occasional designated hitter for the 4th place Rangers. He posted solid hitting numbers, with a .302 average, .364 on-base percentage, and .406 slugging percentage, over 58 games.

He was the first Ranger to hit over .300 with 100 or more at-bats in back to back seasons since Al Oliver accomplished the feat in -.

The best game of Daugherty's career came on Sunday, July 8, 1990, when he was 4 for 5 with two home runs and three RBIs. In fact, Daugherty hit 20% of his career home runs in that game and did so in back to back at-bats against pitchers Roger Clemens and Jeff Reardon. The home run against Clemens occurred in the 7th inning and the blast off of Reardon came in the bottom of the 9th to tie the game. The Rangers would go on to defeat the first placed Red Sox in 11 innings.

Injuries limited Daugherty's  season to only 58 games, for which he posted lackluster statistics of .194/.270/.264. The Rangers subsequently released him following the 1992 season.

Houston Astros and Cincinnati Reds
Daugherty signed with the Houston Astros as a free agent on January 5, . Assigned to the Astros' triple A affiliate the Tucson Toros, Daugherty responded by tearing up the Pacific Coast League by hitting .390/.488/.525 over 42 games. Despite these numbers, he found little playing time with the parent club, as perennial all-star Jeff Bagwell occupied first base and manager Art Howe seemed to prefer using Kevin Bass, Chris Donnels and Chris James as his primary pinch-hitters. Daugherty was 1 for 3 in just four games with Houston. His lone Astros hit came as a pinch-hitter against Bob Tewksbury of the St. Louis Cardinals in a 6-1 Astros loss at Busch Memorial Stadium on May 4, 1993. The Astros later traded Daugherty to the Cincinnati Reds on July 12, 1993, for Steve Carter. With Cincinnati, he played in 46 games while hitting .220/.338/.356.

Chiba Lotte Marines
In January , Daugherty signed with the Colorado Rockies, but did not make the major league roster that Spring. He played in 19 games, batting .119, before being released in June.

References

External links

Retrosheet

1960 births
Living people
American expatriate baseball players in Canada
American expatriate baseball players in Japan
Baseball players from Florida
Chiba Lotte Marines players
Cincinnati Reds players
Helena Gold Sox players
Houston Astros players
Indianapolis Indians players
Jacksonville Expos players
Major League Baseball first basemen
Major League Baseball left fielders
Major League Baseball right fielders
Montreal Expos players
Nippon Professional Baseball first basemen
Oklahoma City 89ers players
People from Hialeah, Florida
Phoenix Firebirds players
San Jose Bees players
Syracuse Chiefs players
Texas Rangers players
Tucson Toros players
West Palm Beach Expos players
Arizona Wildcats baseball players
Anchorage Glacier Pilots players
Mat-Su Miners players
Kearny High School (California) alumni